James Allen Farley (born October 10, 1951) is an American politician. He is a member of the Alabama House of Representatives from the 15th District, serving since 2010. He is a member of the Republican Party.

References

Living people
Republican Party members of the Alabama House of Representatives
People from Bessemer, Alabama
21st-century American politicians
1951 births